Sinagra can refer to:

Sinagra, Sicily, a town in the province of Messina on the island of Sicily in Italy
Sinagra, Western Australia, a suburb of Perth in Australia

People with the surname
 Adam Sinagra (born 1995), Canadian football quarterback 
 Anthony Sinagra (born 1940), American politician
 Diego Sinagra (born 1986), Italian football player, son of Diego Maradona
 Jack Sinagra (1950–2013), American politician 
 Vincenzo Sinagra, criminal